Marco Brand (born 31 May 1957 in Milan) is a former Italian racing driver.

References

1957 births
Living people
Italian racing drivers
FIA European Formula 3 Championship drivers
24 Hours of Le Mans drivers
World Sportscar Championship drivers
Racing drivers from Milan
20th-century Italian people